Mayford Meadows is a  Local Nature Reserve on the southern outskirts of Woking in Surrey. It is owned and managed by Woking Borough Council.

Management of meadows aims to encourage wet grassland with a rich variety of flora. Species of flowering plants include cuckooflower, marsh marigold, purple loosestrife, meadowsweet and yellow water-lily.

There is access from Drakes Way.

References

Local Nature Reserves in Surrey